Hypodicranotus striatulus is an extinct, pelagic trilobite in the order Asaphida, of the family Remopleuridae.  Its fossils are found in Middle Ordovician-aged marine strata in New York State, United States, and in Ontario, Canada.

The dorsal exoskeleton of H. striatulus is very similar to the related genus, Remopleurides, but, H. striatulus has a comparatively enormous, forked hypostome.

References

External links 
 Hypodicranotus at the Paleobiology Database

Remopleurididae
Asaphida genera
Ordovician trilobites of North America
Fossils of Canada
Fossils of the United States
Paleontology in Ontario
Paleozoic life of the Northwest Territories
Paleozoic life of Quebec